Skokówka is a village in the administrative district of Gmina Zamość, within Zamość County, Lublin Voivodeship, in eastern Poland.

The village has a population of 410.

Jan Zamoyski (1542–1605), a Polish nobleman, magnate and Grand Hetman of the Crown, was born in Skokówka.

References

Villages in Zamość County